Gochy is a cultural area in the south-west Kashubia, located in the Bytów County, Pomeranian Voivodeship, Poland. It borders the area around Miastko to the west, Człuchów County to the south, Zabory to the east, and Bytowa Lake Region to the north. From the region originate Gochan people, a subgroup of Kashubian people. Historically, from the area originated various families of Kashubian nobility.

Notes

References 

Kashubia
Bytów County
Kashubians
Ethnic groups in Poland
Lechites
Slavic ethnic groups